This article is a list of diseases of hydrangeas (Hydrangea macrophylla).

Bacterial diseases

Fungal diseases

Viral diseases

References 

 Common Names of Diseases, The American Phytopathological Society

Hydrangea
Hydrangea